Beonna is an Anglo-Saxon name, and may refer to:
 Beonna of East Anglia, King of East Anglia
 Saint Beonna of Glastonbury
 Saint Beonna of Breedon
 Beonna, Bishop of Hereford

References